Oleg Mikhaylovich Kuleshov (born 15 April 1974) is a former Russian handball player who competed in the 1996 Summer Olympics and in the 2004 Summer Olympics. Currently he is the head coach of Dinamo Volgograd women's handball team.

In 1996 he was a member of the Russian team which finished fifth in the Olympic tournament. He played all six matches and scored 23 goals. Eight years later he won the bronze medal with the Russian team in the 2004 Olympic tournament. He played all eight matches again and scored twelve goals.

External links 
 Profile

1974 births
Living people
Russian male handball players
Olympic handball players of Russia
Handball players at the 1996 Summer Olympics
Handball players at the 2004 Summer Olympics
Olympic bronze medalists for Russia
Olympic medalists in handball
Sportspeople from Omsk
Medalists at the 2004 Summer Olympics